is a passenger railway station located in the city of Takasago, Hyōgo Prefecture, Japan, operated by the private Sanyo Electric Railway.

Lines

Station layout
The station consists of two unnumbered ground-level side platforms connected by a level crossing. The station is unattended.

Platforms

Adjacent stations

|-
!colspan=5|Sanyo Electric Railway

History
Iho Station opened on August 19, 1923. Platform extension were made in December 1968. The station building was reconstructed in 1982.

Passenger statistics
In fiscal 2018, the station was used by an average of 1474 passengers daily (boarding passengers only).

Surrounding area
 Takasago City Hall
Takasago City Sports Park
Takasago Municipal Baseball Stadium
Takasago Municipal Athletics Stadium

See also
List of railway stations in Japan

References

External links

 Official website (Sanyo Electric Railway) 

Railway stations in Japan opened in 1923
Railway stations in Hyōgo Prefecture
Takasago, Hyōgo